Casimir IV (in full Casimir IV Andrew Jagiellon;  ;; 30 November 1427 – 7 June 1492) was Grand Duke of Lithuania from 1440 and King of Poland from 1447, until his death. He was one of the most active Polish-Lithuanian rulers, under whom Poland, by defeating the Teutonic Knights in the Thirteen Years' War recovered Pomerania, and the Jagiellonian dynasty became one of the leading royal houses in Europe.

The great triumph of his reign was bringing Prussia under Polish rule. The rule of Casimir corresponded to the age of "new monarchies" in western Europe. By the 15th century, Poland had narrowed the distance separating it from western Europe and become a significant factor in international relations. The demand for raw materials and semi-finished goods stimulated trade, producing a positive balance, and contributed to the growth of crafts and mining in the entire country. He was a recipient of the English Order of the Garter (KG), the highest order of chivalry and the most prestigious honour in England.

Following Casimir's death in 1492, John I Albert succeeded him as King of Poland, and Alexander Jagiellon was proclaimed Grand Duke of Lithuania.

Youth
Casimir Jagiellon was the third and youngest son of King Władysław II Jagiełło and his fourth wife, Sophia of Halshany. He often relied on his instinct and feelings and had little political knowledge, but shared a great interest in the diplomacy and economic affairs of the country. Throughout Casimir's youth, Bishop Zbigniew Oleśnicki was his mentor and tutor, however, the cleric felt a strong reluctance towards him, believing that he would be an unsuccessful monarch following Władysław's death.

Grand Duke of Lithuania

The sudden death of Sigismund Kęstutaitis left the office of the Grand Duchy of Lithuania empty. The Voivode of Trakai, Jonas Goštautas, and other magnates of Lithuania, supported Casimir as a candidate to the throne. However many Polish noblemen hoped that the thirteen-year-old boy would become a Vice-regent for the Polish King in Lithuania. Casimir was invited by the Lithuanian magnates to Lithuania, and when he arrived in Vilnius in 1440, he was proclaimed as the Grand Duke of Lithuania on 29 June 1440 by the Council of Lords, contrary to the wishes of the Polish noble lords—an act supported and coordinated by Jonas Goštautas. When the news arrived in the Kingdom of Poland concerning the proclamation of Casimir as the Grand Duke of Lithuania, it was met with hostility, even to the point of military threats against Lithuania. Since the young Grand Duke was underage, the supreme control over the Grand Duchy of Lithuania was in the hands of the Lithuanian Council of Lords, presided by Jonas Goštautas. Casimir was taught Lithuanian language and the customs of Lithuania by appointed court officials.

During Casimir's rule the rights of the Lithuanian nobility—dukes, magnates, and boyars (lesser nobles), irrespective of their religion and ethnicity—were put on an equal footing to those of the Polish szlachta. Additionally, Casimir promised to protect the Grand Duchy's borders and not to appoint persons from the Polish Kingdom to the offices of the Grand Duchy. He accepted that decisions on matters concerning the Grand Duchy would not be made without the Council of Lords' consent. He also granted the subject region of Samogitia the right to elect its own elder. Casimir was the first ruler of Lithuania baptized at birth, becoming the first native Roman Catholic Grand Duke.

King of Poland
In 1427, the Polish nobility initiated an anti-Jagiellonian opposition and attempted to have Władysław II Jagiełło's sons Władysław III and Casimir IV Jagiellon declared illegitimate to the Polish throne as they, being sons of a Lithuanian noblewoman Sophia of Halshany, had no blood link to the previous ruling Polish dynasty, the Piasts, however Casimir's father ensured the succession for his sons.

Casimir succeeded his brother Władysław III (killed at the Battle of Varna in 1444) as King of Poland after a three-year interregnum on 25 June 1447. In 1454, he married Elisabeth of Austria, daughter of King Albert II of Germany and Elizabeth of Luxembourg, a descendant of King Casimir III of Poland. Her distant relative was Frederick III, Holy Roman Emperor. The marriage strengthened the ties between the house of Jagiellon and the sovereigns of Hungary-Bohemia and put Casimir at odds with the emperor through internal Habsburg rivalry.

That same year, Casimir was approached by the Prussian Confederation for aid against the Teutonic Order, which he promised, by making the separatist Prussian regions a protectorate of the Polish Kingdom. However, when the insurgent cities rebelled against the Order, it resisted and the Thirteen Years' War (1454–1466) ensued. After a long and expensive war, Casimir and the Prussian Confederation defeated the Teutonic Order. In the Second Peace of Thorn (1466), the Order recognized Polish sovereignty over the seceded western Prussian regions, Royal Prussia, and the Polish crown's overlordship over the remaining Teutonic Monastic State, transformed in 1525 into a duchy, Ducal Prussia.

Elisabeth's only brother Ladislaus, king of Bohemia and Hungary, died in 1457, and after that Casimir and Elisabeth's dynastic interests were directed also towards her brother's kingdoms.

King Casimir IV died on 7 June 1492 in the Old Grodno Castle in the Grand Duchy of Lithuania, which was in a personal union with Poland.

Foreign policies

The intervention of the Roman curia, which hitherto had been hostile to Casimir, was due to the permutations of European politics. The pope was anxious to get rid of the Hussite King of Bohemia, George Podebrad, as the first step towards the formation of a league against the Ottoman Turks. Casimir was to be a leading factor in this combination, and he took advantage of it to procure the election of his son Vladislaus II as the King of Bohemia. But he would not commit himself too far, and his ulterior plans were frustrated by the rivalry of Matthias Corvinus, King of Hungary, who even went so far as to stimulate the Teutonic Order to rise against Casimir. The death of Matthias in 1490 was a great relief to Poland, and Casimir employed the two remaining years of his reign in consolidating his position still further.

In 1490, Casimir's son John Albert was elected the King of Hungary by a party among the Hungarian nobles. He was, however, defeated by his older brother, King Vladislaus II of Bohemia. Casimir, who wanted to secure a separate realm for his sons, proposed John Albert. Most Hungarian barons and prelates preferred Vladislaus because his rule in Bohemia had indicated that he would respect their liberties. Vladislaus was crowned King of Hungary on 18 September 1490 in Székesfehérvár.

Around 1480 Casimir was allied with the Great Horde against Muscovy and Crimea. His failure to support Khan Akhmed at the Great stand on the Ugra River contributed to Russia's gaining its independence from the steppe nomads.

Tomb

Casimir was interred at Wawel Cathedral in Kraków, in a red marble tomb sculpted by Veit Stoss. In 1973 a research team of 12 experts opened the tomb. Shortly afterward, 10 of the team died prematurely. It was subsequently found that the deaths were caused by toxins originating from fungus present in the tomb.

Children
 Vladislaus (1 March 1456 – 13 March 1516); combined the thrones of Hungary and Bohemia as Vladislaus II.
 Hedwig Jagiellon (21 September 1457 – 18 February 1502); married George the Rich, of the Wittelsbach dynasty of Bavaria. Delegates had gone to Kraków to negotiate the marriage, and their "Landshut Wedding" took place in Bavaria with much pomp and celebration in 1475, starting a tradition which continues to this day.
 Casimir Jagiellon (3 October 1458 – 4 March 1484); was to have married Kunigunde of Austria, but instead chose religious life, eventually being canonized as Saint Casimir.
 John I of Poland (27 December 1459 – 17 June 1501); succeeded Casimir IV as the king of Poland (1492–1501)
 Alexander I of Poland (5 August 1461 – 19 August 1506); King of Poland (1501–1506)
 Sophie (6 May 1464 – 5 October 1512); married to Margrave Frederick V of Brandenburg-Ansbach
 Sigismund I the Old (1 January 1467 – 1 April 1548); King of Poland (1506–1548)
 Frederick Jagiellon (27 April 1468 – 14 March 1503); Bishop of Kraków (1488–1503), Archbishop of Gniezno and Primate of Poland (1493–1503).
 Anna Jagiellon (12 March 1476 – 12 August 1503); married Bogislaw X, Duke of Pomerania; they had eight children, including Sophie of Pomerania, who became queen of Denmark
 Barbara (15 July 1478 – 15 February 1534); married Duke Georg dem Bärtigen of the Saxony
 Elizabeth Jagiellon (13 November 1482 – 16 February 1517); married Frederick II of Legnica
 Two additional daughters named Elizabeth

Gallery

See also
 History of Poland during the Jagiellonian dynasty
 History of Lithuania
 List of Poles
 Statutes of Nieszawa

Citations

General and cited sources 
 
 
 

 
 

 
 

1427 births
1492 deaths
15th-century Polish monarchs
Burials at Wawel Cathedral
Grand Dukes of Lithuania
Jagiellonian dynasty
Knights of the Garter
Medieval child monarchs
Nobility from Kraków
Polish Roman Catholics